Nong Nam Sai (หนองน้ำใส) is a sub-district, (Tambon), in the Sikhio District of Nakhon Ratchasima Province, Thailand. It was created in 1996, and covers 101 km2, 18 villages, and 12,443 citizens.

References

Thesaban of Nakhon Ratchasima Province